Poritia pleurata, the green gem, is a small butterfly found in India, Myanmar and South Asia that belongs to the lycaenids or blues family.

Range
It ranges from Manipur in India to Myanmar. As per Savela it is found in Manipur, Burma, Sumatra, Peninsular Malaya and Langkawi Islands.

Status
Rare as per Wynter-Blyth.

Description
It is a small butterfly with a 30 to 40 mm wingspan. The basal half or more of the cell in upper forewing is blue. There are apical and terminal spots in 2 and 3, though these may be absent in the dry-season form.  The upper forewing of the females do not have a yellow patch.

See also
List of butterflies of India
List of butterflies of India (Lycaenidae)

Cited references

References
Print

Online

External links

Poritia
Butterflies of Asia
Butterflies described in 1874